São Tomé and Príncipe has Portuguese as the official and national language. It is spoken by virtually all of the population. Locally developed restructured varieties of Portuguese or Portuguese creoles are also spoken: Forro, Angolar and Principense. Cape Verdean Creole is spoken by 8.5% and it is also a Portuguese creole.  French (6.8%) and English (4.9%) are foreign languages taught in schools.

See also 
Portuguese-speaking African countries

External links 
Linguistic situation in São Tomé and Príncipe

References